is a junction passenger railway station located in the city of Chikusei, Ibaraki Prefecture in Japan, operated by East Japan Railway Company (JR East), together with the private railway operator Kantō Railway and the third sector Mooka Railway. It is also a freight depot for the Japan Freight Railway Company (JR Freight).

Lines
It is a terminus of the privately owned Mooka Railway’s Mooka Line and is also served by the Kantō Railway’s Jōsō Line.

Station layout
Shimodate Station has two island platforms and one side platform all connected by footbridges. The side platform has a cutout on its west side, so that the three platforms serve a total of six tracks. The station has a Midori no Madoguchi ticket office.

Platforms

History
Shimodate Station was opened on 16 January 1889. The predecessor of the Mooka Railway began operations from 1 April 1912 and the Bōsō Railway (predecessor of the Kantō Railway) from 1 November 1913. The station was absorbed into the JR East network upon the privatization of the Japanese National Railways (JNR) on 1 April 1987.

Passenger statistics
In fiscal 2019, the JR portion of station was used by an average of 3241 passengers daily (boarding passengers only). In Fiscal 2018, the Kanto Railway portion of the station was used by an average of 1253 passengers daily, and the Mooka Railway portion of the station by 662 passengers daily.

Buses
 There is a bus route which runs from the station to Mount Tsukuba, the bus route name is ''筑西市広域連携バス（Chikuseishi Koiki Renkei Bus）- Chikusei Municipal Conect Between Vicinities and Other Vicinities Bus''

Surrounding area
 
Chikusei City Office
Simodate Post Office

See also
 List of railway stations in Japan

References

External links

 JR East Station Information 
  Mooka Railway Station Information 
 Kantō Railway Station Information 

Railway stations in Ibaraki Prefecture
Mito Line
Railway stations in Japan opened in 1889
Stations of Japan Freight Railway Company
Chikusei